The Nattai National Park is a protected national park that is located in the Macarthur and Southern Highlands regions of New South Wales, in eastern Australia. Part of the Southern Highlands Shale Forest and Woodland, the park is covered in dry sclerophyll (hard leafed) forest – mostly eucalypt and has fairly frequent forest fires. It is largely an untouched wilderness area and receives very few visitors, as it has virtually no facilities and is fairly remote, despite its proximity to Sydney.

The Nattai National Park is one of the eight protected areas that, in 2000, was inscribed to form part of the UNESCO World Heritage-listed Greater Blue Mountains Area. The Nattai National Park is the most southern of the eight protected areas within the World Heritage Site. The national park forms part of the Great Dividing Range.

The national park is bounded to the north by the Nattai State Conservation Area, the Burragorang State Conservation Area, and Lake Burragorang, inclusive of a  exclusion zone surrounding the lake; to the east by the Bargo State Conservation Area and the now partly disused Picton – Mittagong loop railway line; to the south by the Wombeyan Caves Road; to the southwest by the Kanangra-Boyd National Park; and to the west by the Yerranderie State Conservation Area. The Blue Mountains National Park does not directly adjoin the Nattai National Park, located on the northwestern shore of Lake Burragorang.

The Nattai National Park contains much of the course and catchment of the Little, Nattai, Allum and Wollondilly rivers.

History
The area now known as Nattai National Park has had a limited impact from Europeans. Several early expeditions attempting to cross the Blue Mountains passed through the area at the end of the 18th century, and settlers settled in the lower Nattai and Burragorang Valleys in 1827. Early conservationists Myles Dunphy and Herb Gallop went on bushwalks in the region from 1912 onwards. An area held in high regard was a forest of Sydney blue gum around Blue Gum Creek. Dunphy lobbied for the stand to be preserved upon becoming aware of plans to log the area but was unsuccessful and the area was logged in the 1920s and 30s. Dunphy put forward a plan for a Greater Blue Mountains National Park, which incorporated what is now Nattai National Park in the southeast in 1932. The creation of Warragamba Dam in 1960 limited access for development of land upstream, but it was not until 1991 when plans for permanent protection and national park status looked to become realised.

Access
The national park may be accessed via Wattle Ridge Fire Road, northeast of the small town of Hill Top. Unsealed road access to a small unsealed car park at the edge of the park – a four-wheel-drive vehicle is not required. There are no facilities, just an information board, and a logbook. Make sure you sign in and out of the logbook when entering the park.

Alternate access is via the Wombeyan Caves Road.

Activities

Bushwalking
Nattai National Park has several worthwhile bushwalks, however, it is a remote area, and also very dry. Bush camping is allowed anywhere outside the Lake Burragorang exclusion zone, but the destruction of plants is not allowed, so choose your campsite well, and use tents with smaller footprints.  At the Mittagong visitors' information center you should try to get a copy of a yellow covered book that discusses in-depth walks in the Nattai, it is invaluable.  The book was published in 1998 but hopefully, it is still available, it is a great reference for this little known and isolated area.

In summer it can be extremely hot walking along the fire roads, and at campsites is far too hot to get inside a tent until quite late.

Water may be scarce away from the Nattai River and its tributary creeks. The area is fairly remote, and few people hike here, so make sure plans are left with a responsible person, and consider taking an EPIRB. Mobile phones may work on the highest parts of the plateau surrounding the valley but won't work in the valley. Make sure your navigation skills are adequate to route find properly, as fires in the park often clear out undergrowth, which makes finding an indistinct trail nearly impossible (although it also means that walking is much easier). Beware of snakes, especially sunning themselves on fire roads or trails and near creeks – they won't always move away when you come near, so you may end up getting uncomfortably close to one. Red-bellied Black Snakes are the most common type seen. Make sure you carry snake bandage(s) and know how to use them. Treat all water taken from rivers/creeks – there are towns (e.g. Mittagong) upstream, so water may be infected with Giardia. Be aware that when there has been recent and/or substantial rainfall there are many thorny vines, spiky plants and stinging nettles nearby the river. It is best to have an attire that will protect your legs and hands under these circumstances. There are many wombat burrows and soil that have been disturbed by wombats.

Trails
 The Starlights Trail  Nattai Road Park Entrance to Emmetts Flat (a good campsite on the river without facilities) on the Nattai River.  one way with  descent, approx. These are aggregate measurements based on topographical maps and GPS.
 Russells Needle  An extension of Starlights Trail from Emmetts Flat south along the Nattai River to a tall rock spire.
 Katoomba to Mittagong Trail  A well known long-distance trail, through the heart of the Greater Blue Mountains World Heritage Area –  in length.

Climbing

See also
 Protected areas of New South Wales

References

External links
 Free online topographic maps of Nattai – NSW Dept of Lands Spatial Portal
Track notes with topographical map for Russells Needle via Slott Way Track and Starlight Track

National parks of New South Wales
Protected areas established in 1991
1991 establishments in Australia
Blue Mountains (New South Wales)
Macarthur (New South Wales)
Southern Highlands (New South Wales)